Potta Potti  is a 2011 Indian Tamil-language sports comedy film written and directed by newcomer Yuvaraj Dhayalan, featuring cricketer Sadagoppan Ramesh in the starring role alongside several newcomers. The film, initially titled Pattai Patti, released on 5 August 2011 to generally positive reviews.

Plot
Kodaivannan and Kolaivannan, of a remote village decide to marry a rich girl. The villagers decide to hold a cricket match. And make a decision to get the girl married to either of the guys based on who wins the cricket match. The ‘good’ hearted Kodaivannan’s team kidnap a cricketer, Sadagoppan Ramesh, while he is on his way to Thekkady. Kolaivannan then hires a greedy big shot coach from Chennai who eyes the big land of the village for his business.

Now, the teams of Kodaivannan and Kolaivannan have one more reason to fight against each other. To save the village, And the latter for the land which the greedy coach demands. Though, at the last, Kodaivannan wins the match successfully with Sadagopan Ramesh's coaching.

In between, the coach Sadagoppan Ramesh falls in love with that girl whom Kodaivannan and Kolaivannan intend to marry.

Cast
 Sadagoppan Ramesh as himself
 Harini as Ranjitham
 R. Sivam as Kodaivaanan
 Umar as Kolaivaanan
 Mayilsamy as Harichandra
 Avathar Ganesh as Avathaaram

Soundtrack

Reception
The film received overall positive critical response, with most reviewers noting its resemblance to the award-winning Hindi film Lagaan (2001). Rediff'''s Pavithra Srinivasan gave it 2.5 out of 5 and noted that it had "a Lagaan flavour" and "healthy doses of humour". Sify called the film "above average" and noted: "The film works because it is intelligent and uncompromising. It's packed with delicious little scenes, one liners and moments that will have you chuckling pretty much the moment you settle into your seat". Behindwoods gave it 2 out of 5, writing that it "partially succeeds in its attempts" and that it was " well suited for some casual and carefree viewing". NDTV cited: "Potta Potti doesn't have the excitement of a movie based on sports but it doesn't disappoint as a fun-filled movie. Watch it for the innocence with which the villagers approach the game and some hilarious moments..." Malathai Rangarajan from The Hindu wrote: "If keeping the viewer in splits is the aim, Potta Potti'' achieves it with ease", adding that it "may have arrived late, but the delay hardly affects the entertainment it provides".

References

2011 directorial debut films
2010s sports comedy films
2011 films
Indian sports comedy films
Films about cricket in India